The known rulers of Tikal, a major centre of the Pre-Columbian Maya civilization in modern-day Guatemala:

Late Preclassic
 Yax Ehb' Xok – c. AD 60 (90?; see article), dynastic founder
 Siyaj Chan K'awil Chak Ich'aak ("Stormy Sky I") – c. 2nd century
 Yax Ch’aktel Xok – c. 200

Early Classic
 Balam Ajaw ("Decorated Jaguar") – AD 292
 K'inich Ehb' – c. AD 300
 Siyaj Chan K'awiil I - c. AD 307
 Unen Bahlam ("Queen Jaguar") – AD 317
 "Leyden Plate Ruler" – AD 320
 K'inich Muwaan Jol – died AD 359
 Chak Tok Ich'aak I ("Jaguar Paw I") – c.a. 360-378. He died on the same day that Siyah K'ak' arrived in Tikal.
 Yax Nuun Ayiin I – AD 379-404, the son of a foreign noble.
 Siyaj Chan K'awiil II ("Stormy Sky II") – AD 411-456. Son of Yax Nuun Ayiin I.
 K'an Chitam ("Kan Boar") – AD 458-486.
 Ma'Kin-na Chan – ca. late 5th century.
 Chak Tok Ich'aak II ("Jaguar Paw Skull") – AD 486-508. Married to "Lady Hand".
 Ix Kalo'mte' Ix Yo K'in ("Lady of Tikal") – AD 511-527. Co-ruled with Kaloomte' B'alam, possibly as consort.
 Kaloomte' B'alam ("Curl-Head" and "19th Lord") – AD 511-527. Co-ruled with Ix Kalo'mte' Ix Yo K'in as regent.
 "Bird Claw" ("Animal Skull I", "Ete I") – c. AD 527–537.
 Wak Chan K'awiil ("Double-Bird") – AD 537-562. Capture and possible sacrifice by Caracol.
 "Lizard Head II" – Unknown, lost a battle with Caracol in AD 562.

Late Classic
 Jasaw Chan K'awiil I (Ruler A or Ah Cacao) – AD 682-734. Entombed in Temple I. His queen was Lady Twelve Macaw (died AD 704). Triumphed in war with Calakmul in AD 711.
 Yik'in Chan K'awiil (Ruler B) – AD 734-766. His wife was Shana'Kin Yaxchel Pacal of Lakamha. It is unknown exactly where his tomb lies.
 "Temple VI Ruler" – AD 766-768
 Yax Nuun Ayiin II ("Chitam") – AD 768-790
 Chitam II ("Dark Sun") – Buried c. AD 810 Buried in Temple III
 "Jewel K'awil" – AD 849
 Jasaw Chan K'awiil II – AD 869-889

Note: English language names are provisional nicknames based on their identifying glyphs, where rulers' Maya language names have not yet been definitively deciphered phonetically.

 

3rd century in the Maya civilization
4th century in the Maya civilization
5th century in the Maya civilization
6th century in the Maya civilization
7th century in the Maya civilization
8th century in the Maya civilization
9th century in the Maya civilization
3rd-century monarchs in North America
4th-century monarchs in North America
5th-century monarchs in North America
6th-century monarchs in North America
7th-century monarchs in North America
8th-century monarchs in North America
9th-century monarchs in North America